Trip is a 2021 Indian Tamil-language science fiction film written and directed by Dennis Manjunath. The film stars Yogi Babu, Karunakaran and Sunainaa in the lead roles. The film is loosely inspired from Hollywood films Tucker & Dale vs. Evil and Wrong Turn. The film had its theatrical release on 5 February 2021 and received mixed to negative reviews from audiences & critics.

Plot 
A group of friends and family including Lidi (Sunainaa) and Vikram (Praveen Kumar) and others embark on a journey in a dense forest. They eventually meet two strangers Azhagan (Yogi Babu) and Amuthan (Karunakaran) who are carpenters and painters who came to renew a house in the forest. The group meet the two of them covered with blood which is actually paint. The group runs away from them because they think that they are serial killers. After an intense chase, the group of friends camps at a river at night. After some chatting time, Lidi goes to check out the forest. After some distance walking, Lidi finds the two painters and she runs away until she trips and falls towards the ground and goes unconscious. The painters come there in time and see the girl, and they carry her and help her by bringing her with them. Eventually, another girl from the group watches the painters carrying Lidi. The girl they also found a dead person misunderstands and thinks that they are abducting Lidi. She runs back to the camp site and tells everyone about the incident. The boys go to look for Lidi but find the painters' jeep leaving with Lidi. The next morning, Lidi wakes up in the jeep, is shocked when she sees the painter, runs away, and again trips and falls. The painters again help her and tell her their real identity. Lidi is relieved and goes with the painters. The group of friends finds the house where Lidi was staying. The group thought that Lidi had joined the killers. They went to help her but lost two men. One ran away and got eaten by someone and the other one was hit by an axe. The group got scared and thought that the painters killed them but they were totally wrong. That night Vikram and one of the girl went inside the house when the painters were away to help Lidi. The painter on the other side found another girl lying on the ground when they accidentally knocked her down with their jeep. They brought her with them. When they arrive at the house Vikram is confronting Lidi that the painters are killers. The rest of the group came to help the others who are inside the house. After some misunderstanding, the group and the painters started a funny intense fight when they all accidentally broke out a fire. After the fire, another unknown man came with real blood and tied the whole group in the house. continues....

Cast 

Yogi Babu as Azhagan(carpenter)
Karunakaran as Amuthan(painter)
Sunainaa as Lidi (Paapi)
Praveen Kumar as Vikram
Rajendran as Forest Ranger Anjaa Puli (Cameo Appearance)
Kaloori Vinoth as James
Nancy Jennifer as Jenny
Athulya Chandra as Samrin
"Fun Panrom" Siddhu as David 
VJ Rakesh as Shiva
Lakshmi Priya as Meera
Rajesh Shiva as Rizwan
Mak Mani
Sathish
Neethu

Soundtrack
Soundtrack had only one song composed by Siddhu Kumar
What A life - Gaana Bala

Reception
Times of India wrote "On the whole, the film, which is competently shot, might seem mildly interesting for those who haven't seen its Hollywood inspirations, but even then, it is a trip that needs to be taken with caution." Behindwoods wrote "Trip heavily misses out on engagement, but debut director Dennis Manjunath's uninhibited style of storytelling is fresh." Sify called it "a below average forest-based thriller". Avinash Ramachandran of Cinema Express wrote, "It is heavily inspired by famous slasher flicks like Tucker and Dale Vs Evil, but director Dennis Manjunath disarms any criticism on this count by beginning the film with the famous Quentin Tarantino quote — “I steal from every movie ever made”"

References 

2021 films
2020s Tamil-language films
Indian comedy horror films
Films about vacationing
2021 directorial debut films
Slasher comedy films
2021 science fiction films
Indian science fiction horror films